Richard Delgado (born October 6, 1939) is an American legal scholar considered to be one the founders of critical race theory, along with Derrick Bell. Delgado is currently a Distinguished Professor of Law at Seattle University School of Law. Previously, he was the John J. Sparkman Chair of Law at the University of Alabama School of Law. He has written and co-authored numerous articles and books, many with his wife, Jean Stefancic. He is also notable for his scholarship on hate speech and for introducing storytelling into legal scholarship.

Biography

The son of a Mexican-American father who immigrated to the United States by himself at the age of 15, Delgado grew up in a migratory household and attended public schools as a child. He earned an A.B. in philosophy and mathematics at the University of Washington, and then attended the UC-Berkeley School of Law, where he earned a J.D. and served as an editor of the California Law Review.

Delgado previously taught at the University of Alabama School of Law, where he held the John J. Sparkman Chair of Law and taught courses in race and civil rights. Earlier, he also taught at UCLA Law School for eight years and the University of Colorado for fourteen.

He currently teachers at Seattle University School of Law, where he is a distinguished professor of law.

A prolific scholar whose works have appeared in top law reviews and presses and received numerous national awards, Delgado is an amateur cloud-watcher, retired track athlete, and fiction writer.

Selected bibliography

Books

Journal articles 
 Delgado, Richard (1980). "Active Rationality in Judicial Review." Minnesota Law Review. University of Minnesota Law School. via HeinOnline. 64: 467–521.  

 
  Pdf.
  Pdf.
 
 
  Pdf.

References

External links
 University of Alabama School of Law profile

1939 births
Living people
20th-century American lawyers
21st-century American lawyers
American academics of Mexican descent
American legal scholars
Critical race theory
Legal educators
Legal writers
Seattle University faculty
UC Berkeley School of Law alumni
University of Colorado faculty
University of Pittsburgh faculty
University of Washington College of Arts and Sciences alumni